CXC chemokine receptors are integral membrane proteins that specifically bind and respond to cytokines of the CXC chemokine family.  They represent one subfamily of chemokine receptors, a large family of G protein-linked receptors that are known as seven transmembrane (7-TM) proteins, since they span the cell membrane seven times. There are currently six known CXC chemokine receptors in mammals, named CXCR1 through CXCR6.

CXCR1 and CXCR2
CXCR1 and CXCR2 are closely related receptors that recognize CXC chemokines that possess an E-L-R amino acid motif immediately adjacent to their CXC motif.  CXCL8 (otherwise known as interleukin-8) and CXCL6 can both bind CXCR1 in humans, while all other ELR-positive chemokines, such as CXCL1 to CXCL7 bind only CXCR2.   They are both expressed on the surface of neutrophils in mammals.

CXCR3
CXCR3 is expressed predominantly on T cells (T lymphocytes), and also on other lymphocytes [some B cells (B lymphocytes) and NK cells] and is highly induced following cell activation. There are two isoforms, CXCR3-A and CXCR3-B. It has three highly related ligands in mammals, CXCL9, CXCL10 and CXCL11.

CXCR4
CXCR4 (also known as fusin) is the receptor for a chemokine known as CXCL12 (or SDF-1) and, as with CCR5, is utilized by HIV-1 to gain entry into target cells.  This receptor has a wide cellular distribution, with expression on most immature and mature hematopoietic cell types (e.g. neutrophils, monocytes, T and B cells, dendritic cells, Langerhans cells and macrophages). In addition, CXCR4 can also be found on vascular endothelial cells and neuronal/nerve cells.

CXCR5
The chemokine receptor CXCR5 is expressed on B cells and CD4+ Tfh cells and is involved in lymphocyte homing and  the development of normal lymphoid tissue.  Its principal ligand is CXCL13 (or BLC).

CXCR6
CXCR6 was formerly called three different names (STRL33, BONZO, and TYMSTR) before being assigned CXCR6 based on its chromosomal location (within the chemokine receptor cluster on human chromosome 3p21) and its similarity to other chemokine receptors in its gene sequence.  CXCR6 binds the ligand CXCL16.  However, CXCR6 is more closely related in structure to CC chemokine receptors than to other CXC chemokine receptors.

History
ACKR3 was originally called RDC-1 (an orphan receptor) but has since been shown to cause chemotaxis in T lymphocytes in response to CXCL12 (the ligand for CXCR4) prompting the renaming of this molecule as CXCR7. ACKR3 designation has been accepted by the IUIS/WHO Subcommittee on Chemokine Nomenclature. This receptor has also been identified on memory B cells.

References

External links
 

Chemokine receptors